is a Japanese former football player.

Career
Yabu retired at the end of the 2019 season.

Club statistics
Updated to 23 February 2020.

References

External links
Profile at V-Varen Nagasaki
Profile at Kawasaki Frontale

1984 births
Living people
Kokushikan University alumni
People from Isehara, Kanagawa
Association football people from Kanagawa Prefecture
Japanese footballers
J1 League players
J2 League players
J3 League players
Kawasaki Frontale players
Ventforet Kofu players
Roasso Kumamoto players
V-Varen Nagasaki players
Fujieda MYFC players
Association football midfielders